Steven Timothy Davis (born November 10, 1948) is a former professional American football running back. Davis played for five seasons in the National Football League (NFL) for the Pittsburgh Steelers and the New York Jets. He won Super Bowl IX with the Steelers over the Minnesota Vikings.

References

External links
 

1948 births
Living people
American football running backs
College football announcers
Delaware State Hornets football players
New York Jets players
Pittsburgh Steelers players
People from Lexington, Virginia
Players of American football from Virginia
African-American players of American football
21st-century African-American people
20th-century African-American sportspeople